The Pauna language, Paunaka, is an almost unknown Arawakan language in South America. It is an extremely endangered language, which belongs to the southern branch of the Arawakan language family and it is spoken in the Bolivian area of the Chiquitanía, near Santa Cruz and north of the Chaco region. The suffix -ka is a plural morpheme of the Chiquitano language, but has been assimilated into Pauna.

There could be a relationship to the extinct Paiconeca language, which is also part of the Arawakan family. Aikhenvald (1999) lists Paiconeca as a separate language, but Kaufman (1994) subsumed it as a dialect of Pauna.

The Spanish colonisation changed a whole continent. Indigenous languages were displaced and replaced and younger generations did not keep in touch with their linguistic roots anymore.  Spanish and Chiquitano became the main languages in this Bolivian area, and especially Spanish is the medium of teaching in schools. Due to this fact children are focusing on Spanish instead of their original languages. 
Currently there remain approximately ten speakers and semi-speakers, who live in the eastern part of Bolivia among the Chiquitano people. However, 150 people feel to be part of the ethnic group, of which some can still understand Paunaka.   The Paunaka language and culture is currently under investigation.

External links 
 Paunaka-Project, University of Leipzig
 Native languages-Paunaka

References

Aikhenvald, Alexandra Y. 1999. “The Arawak language family”. In: Dixon & Aikhenvald (eds.), The Amazonian Languages. Cambridge: Cambridge University Press, 65–106. 

Arawakan languages
Indigenous languages of the South American Northwest
Languages of Bolivia
Mamoré–Guaporé linguistic area